Cyparissos Stephanos (May 11, 1857 - December 27, 1917) He was an author, mathematician, and professor.  He was a pioneer in 20th century projective geometry.  He studied with Vassilios Lakon.  Lakon and Stephanos were from the island of Kea.  Stephanos furthered his studies in France following the same path of Timoleon Argyropoulos, Dimitrios Stroumpos, and Vassilios Lakon.  In France, Stephanos studied with Jean Gaston Darboux, Camille Jordan, and Charles Hermite.  Jean Gaston Darboux was his doctoral advisor.  He wrote articles in the fields of mathematical analysis, higher algebra, theoretical mechanics, and topology.  He published around twenty-five original works in European journals.  He is known for introducing Desmic system.

He received his Ph.D. in 1878 from the National and Kapodistrian University of Athens. In 1879 he became a member of l'Société mathématique de France. In the early 1880s he studied mathematics in Paris and published many papers in various journals.  He returned to Greece and in 1884 was appointed honorary professor and in 1890 regular professor at the National and Kapodistrian University of Athens. He was also a professor at the National Technical University of Athens and the Hellenic Naval Academy. He was an invited speaker at the International Congress of Mathematicians in 1897 at Zurich, in 1900 at Paris, in 1904 at Heidelberg, in 1908 at Rome, and in 1912 at Cambridge (England).

History
He was born on the island of Kea, his father was a school teacher.  His brother was Clon Stefanos.  Clon is considered the founder of anthropology in Greece.  Cyparissos went to school in Syros.  Afterward, he studied at the University of Athens.  He was awarded a PhD in Mathematics in 1878.  Dimitrios Stroumpos, Ioannis Papadakis and Vassilios Lakon were professors at the institution all three studied in France.  Stefanos also traveled to Paris and studied at the Sorbonne.  His doctoral advisor was Jean Gaston Darboux.  He also studied with world-renowned mathematicians Camille Jordan, and Charles Hermite.  He obtained a doctorate from the  Sorbonne in 1880.  His dissertation was On the Theory of Binary Forms and Elimination (Sur la Theorie des Formes Binaires et sur l'Elimination).

While Stephanos was in Paris he met Hermann Schwarz.  The two discussed Karl Weierstrass's hypercomplex numbers theorem.  In 1883, Stephanos proved that the theorem fails when three-dimensional hypercomplex numbers are applied. Stephanos returned to Athens in 1884.  He became professor at the University of Athens.  He also taught at the elite National Technical University of Athens and Evelpidon.  He was the rector of the University of Athens 1908-1909.

He represented Greece in countless international mathematical congresses.  He was a member of various mathematical societies.  He was the founder of the agricultural society.  He was the founder and director of the first school of commerce in Athens.  He co-founded the Athens Forestry Preservation Society (Φιλοδασικής Εταιρείας) and the Society of Commerce.  He was also the organizer and president of the teachers association in Athens.

Literary Works

See also
List of Greek mathematicians

References

Bibliography 

.

1857 births
1917 deaths
Greek mathematicians
Greek Roman Catholics
National and Kapodistrian University of Athens alumni
Academic staff of the National and Kapodistrian University of Athens
People from Kea (island)
19th-century Greek scientists
19th-century Greek educators
19th-century Greek mathematicians